Domingos Lucas Naftal (born April 23, 1941) is a Mozambican former footballer who played as a forward.

Career 
Naftal began playing at the youth level with FC Porto in 1962. In 1964, he with Porto's first team in the Primeira Divisão. In his debut season with Porto he contributed a goal against S.L. Benfica in the O Clássico. After two seasons with Porto he signed with Vitória Guimarães, and later played with Futebol Clube Tirsense. In 1968, he played in the Segunda Divisão with Sporting Clube da Covilhã, and the following season he signed with Sporting Clube de Espinho.

He would sign with A.C. Marinhense in 1970 and played two seasons with the club. In 1972, he played with Vilanovense Futebol Clube, and later with Aliados Lordelo F.C. In 1975, he played abroad in the National Soccer League with Ottawa Tigers.

References  

1941 births
Living people
Mozambican footballers
Portuguese footballers
Portuguese people of Mozambican descent
Association football forwards
FC Porto players
Vitória S.C. players
F.C. Tirsense players
S.C. Covilhã players
S.C. Espinho players
A.C. Marinhense players
Vilanovense F.C. players
Primeira Liga players
Segunda Divisão players
Canadian National Soccer League players